Cloverdale, also known as Raw Hide, is an unincorporated community in Lauderdale County, Alabama, United States. Cloverdale has a post office with ZIP code 35617, which opened on April 8, 1872.

Cloverdale is bordered by Waterloo to the west, Oakland to the south, and Underwood-Petersville to the southeast.

The community was formerly known as Raw Hide and was home to a large tan yard. The name Cloverdale was adopted in 1889 for the abundance of clover in the area.

References

Unincorporated communities in Lauderdale County, Alabama
Unincorporated communities in Alabama